Maxx Peter Creevey (born 28 April 1995) is an soccer player who plays as a centre back or a left back who is currently players  Police Tero on loan from Buriram United. born in Australia, he represents the Thailand national football team.

Career

Club career

As a youth player, Creevey joined the youth academy of Australian second tier side Sutherland Sharks. In 2013, he joined the youth academy of Buriram in the Thai top flight. In 2016, he signed for Thai second tier club Khon Kaen United, but left due to them being involved with a criminal case. Before the 2018 season, Creevey signed for Chiangmai in the Thai third tier, helping them win the league and earn promotion to the Thai second tier. 

In 2019, he signed for Dutch eighth tier team De Meer. Before the 2020 season, he returned to Buriram in the Thai top flight. In 2020, Creevey was sent on loan to Thai third tier outfit Angthong. In 2021, he was sent on loan to Khon Kaen in the Thai second tier.

International career

Creevey is eligible to represent Thailand internationally through his mother.

References

External links

 

1995 births
Maxx Creevey
Association football defenders
Australian expatriate soccer players 
Australian expatriate sportspeople in Thailand
Australian expatriate sportspeople in the Netherlands
Australian people of Thai descent
Australian soccer players
Maxx Creevey
Maxx Creevey
Expatriate footballers in Thailand
Expatriate footballers in the Netherlands
Maxx Creevey
Maxx Creevey
Maxx Creevey
Living people
Samutsongkhram F.C. players
Maxx Creevey
Maxx Creevey
Maxx Creevey